Si Thoi may refer to several places in Thailand:

Si Thoi, Chiang Rai
Si Thoi, Phayao